The Pine-Richland School District is a mid-sized, suburban public school district serving northern Pittsburgh in Allegheny County, Pennsylvania. Pine-Richland School District encompasses approximately  serving residents of Pine Township and of Richland Township.

In 2010, the US Census Bureau reported an increased population to 22,601 people.  According to 2000 federal census data the district's resident population was 16,914 people. In 2009, the district residents' per capita income was $29,680, while the median family income was $75,982. In the Commonwealth, the median family income was $49,501 and the United States median family income was $49,445, in 2010.

Pine-Richland School District operates three primary schools for grades K-3: Wexford Elementary School, Hance Elementary School and Richland Elementary School. The district operates Eden Hall Upper Elementary School for grades 4–6; Pine-Richland Middle School for grades 7–8, and Pine-Richland High School for grades 9–12.

Pine-Richland High school students may choose to attend A. W. Beattie Career Center  for vocational training. The Allegheny Intermediate Unit IU3 provides the district with a wide variety of services like specialized education for disabled students and hearing, speech and visual disability services and professional development for staff and faculty.

The Mid-Atlantic Alliance for Performance Excellence (MAAPE) program named Pine-Richland School District a 2021 Excellence Award recipient. The Excellence Award is the alliance's highest award level. The district is only the seventh organization to earn the Excellence Award in the past 15 years and the first education sector excellence award recipient.

History
Pine-Richland was first known as the Pine Richland Joint School District in 1958. It was then changed to Babcock School District in 1971 in honor of the Babcock family who donated land to the school district. In the fall of 1982 the name was changed to the current name of Pine-Richland School District.

Extracurriculars
The district offers a wide variety of clubs, activities and an extensive sports program.

Sports
The district funds:

Varsity

Boys
Baseball - AAAA
Basketball- AAAA
Cross country - AAA
Football - AAAAA
Golf - AAA
Ice hockey - club
In-line hockey - club
Lacrosse - AAAA
Soccer - AAA
Swimming and diving - AAA
Tennis - AAA
Track and field - AAA
Volleyball - AAA
Wrestling - AAA

Girls
Basketball - AAAA
Cheer - AAAA
Cross country - AAA
Field hockey - AAA
Golf - AAA
Gymnastics - AAAA
Lacrosse - AAAA
Soccer - AAA
Softball - AAAA
Swimming and diving - AAA
Tennis - AAA
Track and field - AAA
Volleyball - AAA

Middle school sports

Boys
Baseball
Basketball
Cross country
Football
Soccer
Track and field
Wrestling 

Girls
Basketball
Cross country
Field hockey
Lacrosse
Soccer
Softball
Track and field
Volleyball

According to PIAA directory July 2013

References

External links
 Pine-Richland School District
 Pine-Richland High School
 Pine-Richland Middle School
 Eden Hall Upper Elementary School
 Richland Elementary School
 Hance Elementary School
 Wexford Elementary School
 High School Expansion Report

Education in Pittsburgh area
School districts in Allegheny County, Pennsylvania
School districts established in 1958